Acqua di Parma is an Italian lifestyle and fashion company that produces fragrances, candles, bathrobes, and leather accessories. All of its ranges are  exclusively made in Italy, and distributed in 43 countries.

History
The company's original fragrance, Colonia, was created in 1916 in a small perfume factory in the center of Parma's historic old town, after which the company is named.

At the time, the majority of commercial perfumes were much stronger and heavier in composition; so the unusually light and refreshing fragrance from Parma found wide success in Europe.

In the 1930s the increasing popularity of the cologne led to an increase in production and the development of its distribution. The thirties and fifties are described as a 'golden age' for Acqua di Parma Colonia, which became very successful among members of high society, with celebrity clientele.

Over the years, the brand expanded its product range, introducing a home collection that includes bathrobes and towels, and leather goods.

In 1993 the brand was revived by entrepreneurs Luca di Montezemolo (former chairman of Ferrari), Diego Della Valle (President and CEO of Tod's, (a shoeware and leather company)) and Paolo Borgomanero (a major shareholder of lingerie retailer La Perla).

In 1998 Acqua di Parma opened its first boutique on Milan's Via del Gesù (in the Quadrilatero della moda district), followed by Paris’s Rue des Francs Bourgeois in Le Marais in 2012, Rome’s Piazza di Spagna in 2014, and Miami's Brickell City Centre in 2017.

The company was  acquired by multi-national LVMH in 2001, and is now headquartered in Milan.

In May 2008 the company entered the luxury spa market with the Blu Mediterraneo Spa in Porto Cervo (Sardinia). In 2013 the company opened its second spa at the Gritti Palace in Venice.

In 2013, the company launched La Nobiltà del Fare (“The Nobility of Work”), a book focusing on stories of Italian arts and crafts excellence, featuring photography by Giovanni Gastel.

Etihad airways has a deal to supply exclusive leather packs containing samples of the signature fragrance and hand cream in their business, first class and ultimate Residence apartment.

Company logo
The company's logo is the coat of arms of Marie Louise, Duchess of Parma, who ruled from 1816-1847. This is in homage to her rule and to the help she provided to develop the perfume and glass industry of Parma.

Products
Colonias
 Colonia (1916)
 Colonia Essenza (2010)
 Colonia Assoluta (2003)
 Colonia Intensa (2007)
 Colonia Oud (2012)
 Colonia Leather (2014)
 Colonia Ambra (2015)
 Colonia Club (2015)
 Colonia Pura (2017) 
 Colonia Futura (2020) 

Feminine fragrances
 Iris Nobile (2004)
 Iris Nobile Sublime (2012)
 Magnolia Nobile (2009)
 Gelsomino Nobile (2011)
 Rosa Nobile (2014)
 Acque Nobili (2013)
 Profumo (2008)

Blu Mediterraneo
 Arancia di Capri (2000)
 Bergamotto di Calabria (2010)
 Mirto di Panarea (2008) 
 Fico di Amalfi (2006) 
 Mandorlo di Sicilia (1999)
 Ginepro di Sardegna (2014)
 Chinotto di Liguria (2018)
Cipresso di Toscana (2019)

Collezione Barbiere

Blu Mediterraneo Italian Resort

Home fragrances (room sprays and candles)

Home collection (bathrobes and towels)

Leather collections

Gli Esclusivi (luxury home and travel accessories)

Packaging
The company has continued the cylindrical bottles, rounded boxes and bright yellow packaging of the original product. It included a blue variant which was meant to "evoke the energy, the sun and the colours of the Italian Mediterranean."

References

External links

LVMH brands
Companies based in Parma
Italian brands
Design companies established in 1916
Italian companies established in 1916
Fragrance companies
Cosmetics companies of Italy
Altagamma members
Manufacturing companies established in 1916